Mr. Cooper, formerly Nationstar Mortgage Holdings Inc. was founded in 1994 and is headquartered in the Dallas, Texas, area. Nationstar Holdings consists of Nationstar Mortgage, which provides servicing and originations for homeowners throughout the United States, and Xome, which provides technology and data enhanced solutions to the real estate market and companies engaged in the origination and/or servicing of mortgage loans. As of June 30, 2017, Nationstar employed approximately 7,000 people and is one of the largest mortgage servicers in the United States with a servicing portfolio of approximately $500 billion and more than 3 million customers. In 2020, Mr. Cooper originated over 146,000 mortgages with a total value of over $36 billion.

In August 2017, Nationstar began doing business as Mr. Cooper, a name change meant to "personalize the mortgage experience".

History 
Nationstar was founded in Denver, Colorado in 1994 as Nova Credit Corporation.  In 1997, the company moved to Dallas, Texas, where home-builder Centex Homes established Nova Credit Corporation as their in-house lender for new construction and changed the company name to Centex Credit Corporation. In 2001, Centex Credit Corporation was merged into Centex Home Equity Company, and it operated as the subprime mortgage originator and servicer for Centex until 2005.

In 2005, the decision was made to withdraw Centex Homes from non-home-building businesses, including the mortgage business. Fortress Investment Group acquired Centex Home Equity and renamed it Nationstar Mortgage in 2006.

In March 2012, Nationstar Mortgage Holdings, Inc. went public with an initial public offering on the New York Stock Exchange.

In 2017, the company faced financial difficulties, and was rebranded as Mr. Cooper.

In 2018, Nationstar (AKA Mr. Cooper) paid out millions of dollars in settlements in New York and California due to various violations of state banking laws.

In 2020, Nationstar (AKA Mr. Cooper) agreed to a $91 million settlement for mishandling foreclosures and borrowers' payments.

References

Financial services companies of the United States
Mortgage lenders of the United States